The Voq Professional Phone is a tri-band Smartphone based on a 200 MHz Intel XScale PXA262 processor with stacked flash memory, running on Microsoft Windows Mobile 2003 edition. Announced on October 8, 2003, the product combines elements of a mobile phone, a personal messaging device, and a PDA with such distinctive features as a flip-open QWERTY thumbpad (in addition to the familiar 12 key dial pad).

Overview
Despite being awarded the British Columbia Technology Industries Association (BC TIA) "Excellence in Product Innovation Award" in 2004, Sierra Wireless' entry into the competitive Smartphone market eroded their embedded module sales. On July 7, 2005, Sierra Wireless announced they would be exiting the "Voq Professional Phone initiative".

Models:
 A10 - 900/1800/1900 bands (Europe)
 A11 - 850/1800/1900 bands (North America)

The VOQ ships with Windows Mobile 2003 version 4.2.0 build 13349 with a radio REV of 03.06

Operator: 1.6.0.12
Microsoft: 4.20.13349.0
Language: 1.6.0.12
File System: 4.20.13349.0

Differences in ROM versions
using the above ROM version, the end button will not hide current program, it will be unresponsive. when upgraded to WM2003SE, The end button will hide the current application.
the start menu button does not have the windows logo. 2003SE has the windows logo next to Start

Specifications
 Weight 5.11 oz. (with battery)
 Tri-Band GSM/EDGE
A10: 900/1800/1900 MHz
A11: 850/1800/1900 MHz
 Processor: Intel Xscale PXA262 @ 200 MHz
 Memory: 64MB of ROM and 32MB of RAM
 Display LCD (Color TFT/TFD: Colors: 64k)
 Display Resolution: 176 x 220 pixels
 Display Size: 2.2"
 Dimensions: 5.25 x 2.16 x .96 inches
 Wireless connectivity: IrDA, GPRS
 Other connectivity: VOQ USB Connection
 Audio Microphone/Speaker: Built In Speaker, hands-free Headphone ; MP3/WMA Codec
 QWERTY Keyboard - Flip out
 Smart Media: SD
 Operating system: Windows Mobile 2003, upgradeable to 2003SE
 Battery: 1200 mA·h
 AC Adapter:  AC input/frequency: 100 ~ 240 Vac, 50/60 Hz : DC output: 5Vdc and 1A (typical)

Disassembled

References

Windows Mobile Standard devices
Mobile phones introduced in 2004
Sierra Wireless mobile phones